WKAR (AM 870) is an educational radio station, licensed to the trustees of Michigan State University (MSU) at East Lansing, Michigan, United States. The station is part of MSU's Broadcasting Services Division, along with WKAR-FM and WKAR-TV. Studios and offices are located in the Communication Arts and Sciences Building, at the southeast corner of Wilson and Red Cedar Roads on the MSU campus.

WKAR is one of the few National Public Radio (NPR) stations that does not operate 24 hours a day, as it is licensed for daytime-only operation. Its 10,000 watt signal reaches as far east as Flint and Ann Arbor, and as far west as Grand Rapids. The station must sign off at sundown in order to protect the nighttime signal of WWL in New Orleans. Louisiana. It generally signs off between 5 p.m. and 6 p.m. during winter months, returning to the air at 8 a.m., and generally signs off around 8 p.m. during the summer, returning at 6 a.m.

WKAR's programming is also carried by an FM translator station at 102.3 MHz,which continues to operate at night, providing 24 hours a day programming that is also streamed over the Internet.

Programming
The majority of WKAR's schedule consists of NPR national programming, and the BBC World Service. Local programs include the daily news/arts magazine Current State, the daily sports talk/call-in Current Sports and the long-running Spanish-language Ondas en Español hosted by Tony "El Chayo" Cervantes on weekends.

History

8YG
WKAR was first licensed in August 1922. However its establishment was an outgrowth of earlier radio activities at the then-Michigan Agricultural College. In 1920 the college was issued a "Technical and Training School" license for radio station 8YG. That year Professor Arthur R. Sawyer, head of the School of Electrical Engineering, made a proposal for establishing a broadcast service distributing information of interest to local farmers, but at the time was unable to procure the funding needed for the idea.

8YG was primarily used for training purposes, and also participated as a relay station, forwarding messages sent between amateur stations. The station was also occasionally used for general broadcasts, including a reported January 24, 1922, play-by-play broadcast of a basketball game by a college team against one at Mount Pleasant Normal School. The following May 13 a Founders Day speech by President Friday was broadcast for reception by scattered alumni clubs.

WKAR
The Department of Commerce, which regulated radio at this time, eventually adopted a regulation requiring that stations making broadcasts intended for the general public needed to be formally licensed as broadcasting stations. On August 18, 1922, the college was issued its first broadcasting license, for operation on the standard "entertainment" wavelength of 360 meters (833 kHz). The call sign WKAR was randomly assigned from a sequential list of available call letters. WKAR was the second broadcasting station licensed in the Lansing area, and is the oldest surviving one. It was one of a number of AM stations established by universities (often land-grant institutions) in the early days of radio.

The station was reassigned to multiple transmitting frequencies in its early years, moving to 1070 kHz in 1923, 1050 kHz in early 1925, and 1080 kHz in late 1927. On November 11, 1928, it was assigned to daytime-only operation on 1040 kHz, as part of the Federal Radio Commission's implementation of General Order 40. In 1936 it was transferred to 850 kHz, and moved to its current frequency, 870 kHz, in March 1941, as part of the major band shift enacted by the North American Regional Broadcasting Agreement. Between 1939-1941 WKAR boosted power from 1,000 to 5,000 watts. The station expanded to its current 10,000 watts in the late 1960s.

The WKAR stations were charter members of NPR, and were among the 90 stations that carried the initial broadcast of All Things Considered.

Before 2010, Michigan Radio flagship WUOM in Ann Arbor was the only source of 24-hour NPR news programming for Lansing; its signal easily covers most of the Lansing area. That year WKAR's programming began to be simulcast on a WKAR-FM HD subcarrier, originally its HD2 subchannel, before moving to the HD3 channel in 2012. However, as of May 2018 WKAR was no longer carried on a WKAR-FM HD subchannel. It began to be relayed by a low-powered FM translator, originally at FM 94.5, which moved to FM 105.1 in March 2018. The translator FM station moved to 102.3 on November 10, 2021.

References

External links

FCC History Cards for WKAR (covering 1929-1981)
WKAR History (Michiguide.com)

NPR member stations
Michigan State University
KAR (AM)
Radio stations established in 1922
KAR (AM)
1922 establishments in Michigan
KAR
Radio stations licensed before 1923 and still broadcasting